UTC+07:00 is an identifier for a time offset from UTC of +07:00. It is 7 hours ahead of UTC, meaning that when the time in UTC areas is midnight (00:00), the time in UTC+07:00 areas would be 7:00 in the morning.

Also known as Indochina Time (ICT) and Western Indonesian Time (WIB) (in Indonesia), it is used in:

As standard time (year-round)
Principal cities: Medan, Lhokseumawe, Langsa, Garut, Gunungsitoli, Karawang, Jepara, Lubuklinggau, Batam, Pangkal Pinang, Palangkaraya, Pagar Alam, Probolinggo, Pasuruan, Purwakarta, Purwokerto, Pekalongan, Prabumulih, Palembang, Pematangsiantar, Padangsidempuan, Pekanbaru, Padang, Padang Panjang, Pontianak, Pariaman, Payakumbuh, Dumai, Binjai, Bogor, Cimahi, Cirebon, Bukittinggi, Bandar Lampung, Palembang, Jakarta, Bandung, Semarang, Surakarta, Surat Thani, Nakhon Si Thammarat, Solok, Sawahlunto, Tanjungpinang, Singkawang, Tebing Tinggi, Sibolga, Sungai Penuh, Sukabumi, Sumedang, Salatiga, Tasikmalaya, Tegal, Udon Thani, Yogyakarta, Surabaya, Ho Chi Minh City, Hanoi, Phnom Penh, Vientiane, Bangkok, Krasnoyarsk, Novosibirsk

North Asia
Russia – Krasnoyarsk Time
Siberian Federal District
Altai Krai
Altai Republic
Kemerovo Oblast
Khakassia
Krasnoyarsk Krai
Novosibirsk Oblast
Tomsk Oblast
Tuva

East Asia
It is considered the westernmost time zone in East Asia.

Mongolia – Time in Mongolia
Western part, including Khovd, Uvs, Bayan-Ölgii, Govi-Altai and Zavkhan

Southeast Asia
Cambodia – Time in Cambodia (Indochina Time)
Indonesia – Western Indonesia Time
Western zone, including: 
All provinces of Sumatra and surrounding islands:
 Aceh
 North Sumatra
 West Sumatra
 Riau
Riau Islands
 Jambi
 South Sumatra
Bangka Belitung Islands
 Bengkulu, and
 Lampung
Java, including:
 Banten
 Jakarta
 West Java
 Central Java
 East Java, and
 Special Region of Yogyakarta
Parts of Kalimantan:
West Kalimantan
Central Kalimantan
Laos – Time in Laos (Indochina Time)
Thailand – Time in Thailand (Indochina Time)
Vietnam – Time in Vietnam (Indochina Time)

Oceania

Indian Ocean
Australia – Christmas Island Time
Christmas Island

Antarctica

Southern Ocean
Some bases in Antarctica. See also Time in Antarctica.
Australia
Davis Station

Discrepancies between official UTC+07:00 and geographical UTC+07:00
Since legal, political, and economic in addition to physical or geographical criteria are used in the drawing of time zones, it follows that official time zones do not precisely adhere to meridian lines. The UTC+07:00 time zone, were it drawn by purely geographical terms, would consist of exactly the area between meridians 97°30′ E and 112°30′ E. As a result, there are places which, despite lying in an area with a "physical" UTC+07:00 time, actually use another time zone. Conversely, there are areas that have adopted UTC+07:00, even though their "physical" time zone is UTC+08:00, UTC+06:00, or even UTC+05:00.

Areas within UTC+07:00 longitudes using other time zones
This concerns areas within 97°30′ E to 112°30′ E longitude.

Using UTC+06:30

Eastern part of Myanmar

Using UTC+08:00

In China, many parts of central China including these divisions:
Hainan
Guangxi
Yunnan
Guizhou
Sichuan
Chongqing
Shaanxi
Ningxia
Gansu
western two-thirds of Hunan
western half of:
Hubei
Shanxi
Inner Mongolia, including its capital Hohhot.
western third of:
Guangdong
Henan

In Russia:
Irkutsk Oblast
Buryatia
Outside China & Russia:
Most of central Mongolia including the capital Ulaanbaatar
Peninsular Malaysia
Western part of Sarawak in Malaysian Borneo including Kuching
Singapore

Using UTC+09:00

A (western) part Sakha Republic in Russia, including the urban localities Aykhal and Udachny.

Areas outside UTC+07:00 longitudes using UTC+07:00 time

Areas between 67°30′ E and 97°30′ E ("physical" UTC+05:00 and UTC+06:00)
The westernmost part of Indonesia including most of the province Aceh with its capital Banda Aceh.
The westernmost part of Mongolia
Parts of Russia:
A large part of Krasnoyarsk Krai
Tuva
Khakassia
Altai Republic
Altai Krai
Kemerovo Oblast
Novosibirsk Oblast (mostly within the "physical" UTC+05:00 area)
Tomsk Oblast (partly within the "physical" UTC+05:00 area)

Areas between 112°30′ E and 127°30′ E ("physical" UTC+08:00)
In Indonesia:
The easternmost part of Java including East Java's capital Surabaya, Sidoarjo, Malang, and Banyuwangi.
The island of Bawean and Madura, and islands of Kangean and Masalembu, which administratively belong to East Java Province.
Eastern part of West Kalimantan, and most of Central Kalimantan, including the capital Palangka Raya

In Russia:
 The very easternmost part of Krasnoyarsk Krai

Historical time offsets

The Republic of China's offset for this time zone was Kansu-Szechwan, and was used until 1949, when the Chinese Communist Party took control of Mainland China following the Chinese Civil War and made UTC+08:00 the standard time for all areas under its control. Formerly, from 1918 to 1949, this time offset was used in eastern Sikang and Tsinghai, central Outer Mongolia (1921–1924), and all of Yunnan, Kwangsi, Kweichow, Ningsia, Suiyuan, Kansu, and Shensi.

This time zone was also the standard used in Malaysia and Singapore from 1 June 1905 to 31 December 1932.

See also
Singapore Standard Time
Time in Australia
Time in Cambodia
Time in China
Time in Indonesia
Time in Laos
Time in Malaysia
Time in Mongolia
Time in Russia
Time in Thailand
Time in Vietnam

References

External links

Asian time zones

UTC offsets
Time in Southeast Asia
Time in Australia
Time in Thailand
Time in Indonesia
Time in Vietnam
Time in Mongolia